Vehicle registration plates of the Principality of Liechtenstein are composed of the letters FL, followed by the small version of the coat of arms of Liechtenstein and up to five digits. The letters FL stand for Fürstentum Liechtenstein. Standard license plates show white characters on a black background, using the same type of font as Swiss license plates.

Liechtenstein license plates are assigned to the vehicle owner, not to the vehicle. They can be registered as interchangeable plates for a maximum of two vehicles. Rear license plates can be requested either in a long or a square format.

The numbers are usually assigned consecutively, in ascending order. Due to the small size of the country (approx. 39,500 inhabitants), no further distinguishing codes are needed. The current system was introduced in 1920 and is essentially the same as that of Switzerland. On 30 June 2022, a total of 36,723 motor vehicles, 4,908 motorcycles and 4,169 trailers were registered in Liechtenstein.

History 

Between 1852 and 1919 the Principality of Liechtenstein was closely linked to the Austro-Hungarian Monarchy by a customs treaty.
 1905 - Austria required its residents to register their motor vehicles and to display license plates. It was decided that the few vehicles in Liechtenstein should also be provided with austrian license plates. The first plates showed black characters on a white base and consisted of the letter W, which was the code letter for the westernmost Austrian state  Vorarlberg, and an individual evidence number, e.g. W 123. The first known car owners in Liechtenstein were a businessman from Vaduz in 1902 and a doctor from Schaan in 1905.

 1915 - Liechtenstein introduced its first own license plates. The Austrian plates remained valid for the time being and did not have to be replaced immediately. The first vehicle registration plates of Liechtenstein showed white characters on a black base and the registration mark consisted of the letter L for Liechtenstein and an individual control number, e.g.    L 12  .

 1920 - Liechtenstein introduced new license plates with the letters FL, followed by a coat of arms and up to five digits, issued in sequential order. In 1950, a total of 472 motor vehicles were registered in Liechtenstein.

 1957 - The blue and red national coat of arms was replaced by the golden and red coat of arms of the Princely House. The format of the license plates and the type of font were slightly modified. In 1970, a total of 6,210 motor vehicles were registered in Liechtenstein.

 1972 - The size of the license plates and the type of font were aligned to the Swiss license plates. The size of the coat of arms was reduced to its present size. Old license plates remained valid and were only replaced if necessary or due to poor legibility. Occasionally, old license plates from the time before 1972 can still be seen on vehicles today.

Today, Liechtenstein is the last European country to issue black standard plates. In other countries, black license plates are only issued for specific vehicle groups (e.g. historical or army vehicles) or optionally alongside white and yellow license plates (e.g. in the Bailiwick of Guernsey). A change of colours is not planned in the near future and also not desired, because the Liechtensteiners like their black license plates.

Current System 
Motor vehicles in Liechtenstein must display a front and a rear license plate made of corrosion-resistant metal (aluminium). Excluded are trailers, motorcycles and mopeds, snowmobiles, small and light motor vehicles as well as agricultural vehicles and single-axle motor vehicles. They all have only one rear license plate (except agricultural vehicles, these generally only have a front plate, which can be attached to the front or rear of the vehicle). The license plates may be provided with a reflective or luminescent coating. Since January 2019, matt black license plates have also been issued on request. A single plate for motorcycles costs CHF 130, a pair of matt black license plates for cars costs CHF 250.

Liechtenstein license plates are assigned to the vehicle owner, not to the vehicle. If the owner buys a new vehicle, the same license plates are attached to the new vehicle. They can be used as interchangeable plates for two vehicles. Rear license plates can be requested either in a long or a high format.
The license plate numbers are generally assigned in increasing order, License plates with lower numbers that have been returned will be assigned to a new owner after a blocking period of one year. A change of owner or the passing on of license plates to another person is only possible within one's own family up to the 3rd degree of kinship, for example, from father to son or nephew.

If the holder no longer registers a new vehicle, the plates must be returned to the Road Traffic Office in Vaduz. Temporary license plates do not have to be returned after the deadline, but they will be officially confiscated in the event of misuse. The holder may deposit his license plates for a fee. If the registration is cancelled, the plates will be destroyed and the number will be assigned to a new owner after a blocking period of one year. Stolen or lost plates are blocked for 15 years.

On 30 June 2022, 30,654 passenger cars and 574 passenger transport vehicles were registered in Liechtenstein. 3,118 vans, 290 trucks and 243 tractor units were registered in the category of transport vehicles. In the trailer category, 3,125 transport trailers, 332 semi-trailers and 202 caravans were registered in Liechtenstein (as of June 2021).

Colours 

  License plates with white characters on a black base are issued for all vehicles for the transport of goods and persons, i.e. for passenger vehicles, trucks, trailers, buses, commercial tractors, motorcycles, three-wheeled motor vehicles and single-axle engines.
  License plates with yellow characters on a black base are issued for vehicles with short-term registrations.
  License plates with a light green background and black characters are issued for agricultural and forestry vehicles and their trailers.
  License plates with a light blue background and black characters are issued for industrial and utility vehicles and trailers.
  License plates with a light brown background and black characters are issued for exceptional vehicles and trailers.
  License plates with a yellow background and black characters are issued for small motorcycles, light motor vehicles and electric vehicles.
  License plates with a dark yellow background and black characters are issued for mopeds and e-bikes.
  License plates with a red background and white characters were introduced in March 2022 for attachment to rear load carriers

Numbers 

The number series begin for motor cars and trailers on the one hand and motorcycles, small and three-wheel motor vehicles on the other hand separately and for each type of plate separated by background colour and special marking and takes place in ascending order. In the case of motor vehicles and trailers, the numbers are divided into several number ranges, which are reserved for certain vehicle groups or purposes:

 FL 1, FL 2, FL 3, FL 4, FL 6, FL 8 and FL 10 are reserved for official vehicles of the Princely Family.
 FL 5 is reserved for the official limousine of the Head of Government, the Prime minister of Liechtenstein.
 FL 7, FL 9 and FL 11 to FL 20 are reserved for the marked vehicles of the Liechtenstein Police.
The numbers from 1 to 20 are assigned exclusively for these official vehicles. The numbers from 21 to 100 are not available for standard passenger vehicle license plates. They are only used for standard motorcycle license plates and license plates with green, blue and brown colour. The lowest available number for those license plates is always FL 21.
 FL 101 to FL 300 are reserved for dealer plates on cars, trucks and trailers.
 FL 301 to FL 1999 was the initial number series of trailer registration plates.
 FL 2000 to FL 40199 was the initial number series of registrations on motor cars and trucks.
 FL 40200 to FL 40250 are reserved for buses of public transport.
 FL 40251 to FL 41440 are currently (2022) being issued for motor cars and trucks.
 FL 41441 to FL 41449 are reserved for vehicles of the Liechtenstein Red Cross.
 FL 41450 to FL 49999 will be the next number series for motor cars and trucks.
 FL 50000 to FL 50299 are reserved for short-term license plates on motor vehicles and trailers.
 FL 65100 to FL 68100 are the currently (2022) issued numbers for trailers.
 FL 90000 to FL 92999 are reserved for temporary registrations on motor cars and trucks.
 FL 95000 to FL 95099 are reserved for temporary registrations on trailers.

Ordinary combinations of digits that are not already assigned to another holder can be reserved at the Road Traffic Office. Reservations are only possible within the currently available number range (up to FL 40799 for passenger car plates and up to FL 6100 for motorcycle license plates). The standard fee for a desired number is CHF 500. In the case of an order, a delivery period of 2 to 3 weeks is to be expected.

Returned license plates with very low numbers (4-digit motor car plates, 2-digit motorcycle plates) or eye-catching number combinations (e.g. FL 21212, FL 33333, FL 40000 etc.) are only available via license plate auctions at the Road Traffic Office in Vaduz. These auctions usually take place every 2 years. As of today, approximately 50 percent of all available numbers (FL 1 to FL 99999) for standard black passenger car plates have been assigned, 50 percent are still available.

Dimensions 
The license plates have the following formats, with the corners rounded with a radius of 1 cm:
 Rear plates for motor vehicles and trailers have a length of 50 cm and a height of 11 cm or a length of 30 cm and a height of 16 cm. Until 1959, rear license plates were only available in a square format (31 × 24 cm). Since 1959, they have also been available in a long format on request. These were initially 44 × 11 cm, later 38 × 11 cm in size. Since 1987 they have the current dimensions. The square rear license plates have current dimensions since 1972.
 Front plates for motor cars, single-axle engines, agricultural vehicles and utility trailers have a length of 30 cm and a height of 8 cm. The front license plates were initially 38 × 11 cm in size, since 1972 they have had the current dimensions.
 License plates for motorcycles, small and light motor vehicles and electric vehicles have a length of 18 cm and a height of 14 cm.
 License plates for mopeds and e-bikes have a length of 10 cm and a height of 14 cm.

The coat of arms as well as the letters and numbers are embossed to 1,5 mm raised. The plates may be provided with a retroreflective or luminous coating. They must be mounted as vertical as possible (inclination upwards max. 30°, downwards max. 15°) and at a height between 0,20 m (lower edge) and 1,50 m (upper edge). The rear plate shall be legible in the longitudinal axis of the vehicle and on both sides of it within an angle of 30°.

Temporary plates 

Since 1960, provisional license plates are available for motor vehicles that are temporarily registered in Liechtenstein. The plates are valid for a maximum of one year and all taxes and fees must be collected in advance. The plates show a control mark bearing the number of the month of expiry and the last two digits of the expiry year. Front plates show a dot instead of the coat of arms. Temporary license plates are continuously being reissued and always receive numbers from the same defined number range. The numbering process is usually restarted after 2 years with the lowest available number.

Temporary registration plates of duty unpaid vehicles show the additional letter Z, which stands for customs. Provisional license plates do not have to be returned after the deadline, but must be officially confiscated in the event of misuse. Persons with short-term residence permits or persons with a foreign residence and a location address (for the vehicle) in Liechtenstein, for example, may receive these provisional license plates.

Short-term license plates 

Short-term license plates have yellow characters on a black base and numbers between FL 50000 and FL 50299. They can be issued for a validity period of 24, 48, 72 or 96 hours. After expiry of the validity, the license plates must be returned immediately. Short-term plates are only valid in Liechtenstein and Switzerland. The costs for a short-term registration, including a liability insurance, are: 30 Swiss francs (CHF) per day for trailers, 40 CHF for motorcycles, 50 CHF for passenger cars and 60 CHF per day for trucks. In addition, a deposit of 200 CHF must be paid. A vehicle with short-term plates may not be rented out and a maximum of 8 persons may be in such a vehicle. Vehicles subject to the heavy vehicle tax may not be used to transport goods. The vehicle must be operationally safe and meet the technical requirements for road vehicles. The steering, lighting and brakes must function properly. The tread depth of the tyres must be at least 1,6 mm and the vehicle must not have any defects essential for road safety. If the last test date is outside the statutory periodicity, the vehicle must be subjected to a road safety test before the short-term plates are issued.

Dealer license plates 

Dealer plates are special license plates for the motor vehicle industry, colloquially also called "garage numbers". They are available for registered vehicle dealers and repair shops in conjunction with a collective vehicle registration document. The number range starts with FL 101 U. The additional letter U stands for companies. Dealer plates may be used for all motor vehicles, e.g. for inspection and transfer trips, regardless of their engine performance and emissions. The use of the motorway without a motorway vignette is also permitted for vehicles suitable for motorways, but not the journey abroad (not even to the neighbouring countries), as these plates do not have to be recognised due to the Vienna Convention. In addition to attaching them to the proper car number holders of the vehicles, it is also permissible to attach these "U-numbers" by means of a magnet on the bonnet and attached to the rear or in a plastic bag. Vehicles with dealer plates may be provided to prospective buyers for unaccompanied journeys if the vehicles are operationally safe and comply with the regulations.

Agricultural vehicles 

Registration plates with green base colour and numbers between FL 21 and FL 2000 are issued for agricultural and forestry vehicles and trailers that are not used for commercial journeys and allow a maximum speed of 40 km/h. Only one front plate is required, which can be mounted either at the front or rear of the vehicle. On 30 June 2021, 1,023 agricultural vehicles and 142 trailers were registered in Liechtenstein.

Utility vehicles 

Registration plates with blue base colour and numbers between FL 21 and FL 2000 are available for vehicles and trailers that do not transport things, but are used exclusively for carrying out work, e.g. fire engines, vehicles and trailers in building and civil engineering, forestry or road maintenance, e.g. Winter service vehicles, cleaning vehicles etc. On 30 June 2021, 799 industrial and work vehicles and 268 work trailers were registered in Liechtenstein.

Exceptional vehicles 

Registration plates with light brown base colour and number series either starting from FL 21 or from FL 5000 (for trailer plates) are available for exceptional vehicles and trailers that do not comply with the general regulations regarding weight and size due to their design or intended use. These vehicles may only operate with a special written permit. This category includes, for example, mobile cranes, heavy excavators, extra-wide tractors, heavy transport vehicles or heavy-duty trailers etc.

Repeater plates 

Since March of 2022, motor vehicle owners in Liechtenstein have the possibility to obtain a third license plate, showing the same number in white characters on a red base, for attachment to the rear load carrier. Until then, the black rear license plate had to be mounted on the load carrier if the load carrier concealed the license plate on the rear of the vehicle. This new repeater plate is being issued exclusively in the long format and it may only be used in combination with the regular pair of black license plates. Liechtenstein introduced the third license plate parallel to Switzerland on 1 March 2022.

Motorcycle license plates 
 Registration plates for motorcycles, scooters, quad bikes, small and three-wheel motor vehicles, electric vehicles and light motor vehicles as well as for their trailers have a length of 18 cm and a height of 14 cm. On 30 June 2021, a total of 4,936 vehicles were registered in the motorcycle category. With 4,561 vehicles, conventional motorcycles are the most important segment in this group. Of these, 2,990 were standard motorcycles and 1,571 scooters.

 License plates for mopeds and E-bikes have a length of 10 cm and a height of 14 cm. Until 1985, they were issued annually and the plates were replaced with new plates each year. Also in 1985, the number series jumped from FL 31xxx to FL 80000 and the plates were issued for permanent use. Since then, moped plates must be equipped with an annually renewed insurance control mark, which is valid from 1 January of the printed submission year to 31 May of the following year.

 The numbers on motorcycle and moped plates are generally assigned in ascending order. The only exceptions are the yellow plates for light motorcycles and electric vehicles, they are being issued with numbers of all areas within the specified number range from FL 7001 to FL 7999.

Former license plates 

 From 1977 to 2001, Liechtenstein issued special license plates for rental vehicles, showing the additional letter V, which stands for rental, to the right of the number. Since 2001, rental vehicles in Liechtenstein are using normal standard license plates again, as they did before 1977. 

 From 1933 to 1977, Liechtenstein issued so-called "test plates" for motor cars and motorcycles. They were then replaced by the current dealer plates. These plates were only available for the motor vehicle industry, in combination with a collective vehicle document, for test drives of vehicles, etc. The plates had normal serials (without the "U") on regular plates with a black base colour, but the letters and numbers were written in red colour.

Souvenir plates

External links 

 Road Traffic Office website
 Picture gallery of Liechtenstein license plates on „Plateshack“
 Picture gallery of Liechtenstein license plates on „Europlates“
 Picture gallery of Liechtenstein license plates on „Francoplaque“
 Picture gallery of Liechtenstein license plates on „World License Plates“
 Picture gallery of Liechtenstein license plates on „Dutch Numberplates Archives“

References 

Transport in Liechtenstein
Liechtenstein
Liechtenstein-related lists